The Wolfe–Montcalm Monument is in Governors' Garden beyond the southern side of the Château Frontenac, Quebec.  The obelisk is the oldest monument in Quebec City and the second-oldest war monument in Canada (1827) (the first being Nelson's Column, Montreal, 1809). The mason who made the monument was John Phillips and the architect was Captain John Crawford Young of the 79th (Cameron) Highlanders. The monument commemorates the gallantry of the two generals, James Wolfe and Louis-Joseph de Montcalm, who fought (and both died) in the Battle of the Plains of Abraham; it is one of very few monuments to the victor and the defeated in the same battle. The monument was unveiled in 1828 by Governor Dalhousie. The translation of the Latin on the monument, written by John Charlton Fisher reads "Their courage gave them a common death, history a common fame, posterity a common memorial."

The monument was whitewashed sometime after 1987.

Gallery

References

External links 

History of Quebec City
Monuments and memorials in Quebec
Canadian military memorials and cemeteries